The 2014–15 Xavier Musketeers women's basketball team represented Xavier University during the 2014–15 NCAA Division I women's basketball season. The Musketeers, led by fourth-year head coach Brian Neal, they played their games at the Cintas Center and were second year members of the newly reorganized Big East Conference. They finished the season 18–15, 8–10 to finish in seventh place. They advanced to the quarterfinals of the Big East women's tournament where they to DePaul. They were invited to the Women's Basketball Invitational where they defeated to William & Mary in the first before losing to Siena in the quarterfinals.

Roster

Schedule

|-
!colspan=9 style="background:#062252; color:#FFFFFF;"| Regular Season

|-
!colspan=9 style="background:#062252; color:#FFFFFF;"| Big East Women's Tournament

|-
!colspan=9 style="background:#062252; color:#FFFFFF;"| WBI

See also
2014–15 Xavier Musketeers men's basketball team

References

Xavier
Xavier Musketeers women's basketball seasons